1700 is an Australian music video show, airing on C31 Melbourne & Geelong Wednesday and Friday afternoons from 5pm, it previously aired weeknights from 5-6pm. Produced by SYN TV, the show features various recurring hosts introducing music videos, conducting interviews and performances from local and international artists, and is billed as "Melbourne's only daily live, youth produced music show".

Notable former guests include SAFIA, The 1975, and You Me at Six. The programme has previously covered festivals and events such as BIGSOUND, Groovin' the Moo, and The Falls Festival.

Awards

Antenna Awards

|-
! scope="row" | 2009
| 1700
| Outstanding Young Persons Program
| 
|-
! scope="row" | 2014
| 1700
| Outstanding Young Persons Program
| 
|-
! scope="row" | 2019
| 1700
| Best Music Program
|

See also

 List of Australian music television shows
 List of Australian television series

References

External links
Website
Production website
1700 on IMDb
Tumblr page 

SYN Media shows
2006 Australian television series debuts
2010s Australian television series
Australian music television series
Television shows set in Victoria (Australia)
Australian community access television shows
English-language television shows